Mbule or Mbulle is a small community in Cameroon, to the north of Tombel in the Southwest Region, on the slopes of Mount Kupe.

Conflict 
On 31 December 1966 a Land Rover was attacked by unknown perpetrators while near Mbule. Four passengers were killed including three Bakossi.
Tensions had been building between the Bakossi and Bamileke migrants to the region, and the incident triggered a rampage in which many Bamileke were killed.

Wildlife 
In 1979 a single specimen of Ardisia koupensis was collected from the western slopes of Mount Kupe, just above Mbule.
Since then, two other locations have been found on the mountain above Kupe village. 
The plant, which grows in the understorey of mid-altitude to submontane closed canopy forest, was on the 2010 IUCN Red List of Threatened Species, classified as Endangered.

Agriculture 
In 2008 young farmers had begun to plant oil palms in Mbulle, but they did not have a processing machine, and lacked fertilizers and chemicals. They also had no way to get their crop to market.

References

Populated places in Cameroon